The Ghostwalker series is the name for a collection of paranormal/romance novels by the American author Christine Feehan which feature the a group of men in the Special Forces and young women who have had their psychic abilities enhanced in a secret experiment.

Novels in the series 
 Shadow Game (August 26, 2003)
 Mind Game (July 27, 2004)
 Night Game (November 1, 2005)
 Conspiracy Game (October 31, 2006)
 Deadly Game (February 27, 2007)
 Predatory Game (February 26, 2008)
 Murder Game (December 30, 2008)
 Street Game (December 29, 2009)
 Ruthless Game (December 28, 2010)
 Samurai Game (July 3, 2012)
 Viper Game (January 27, 2015)
 Spider Game (January 26, 2016)
 Power Game (January 24, 2017)
 Covert Game (March 20, 2018)
 Toxic Game (March 12, 2019)
 Lethal Game (March 3, 2020)
 Lightning Game (March 2, 2021)
 Phantom Game (March 1, 2022)

Ghostwalkers 
The Ghostwalker series has groups of men (and a few women), called Ghostwalkers who go on special missions. Ghostwalkers have psychic abilities and genetic enhancements, some abilities and enhancements are more rare than others. Each Ghostwalker team must have an "anchor" who draws the psychic backlash, especially of violence, away from the other team-members. Without an anchor, the Ghostwalkers' abilities are limited because of the psychic backlash and the inability to manage in crowds.

Ghostwalker teams and corresponding book 
Team One (11)
Ryland "King" Miller & Lily Whitney – Shadow Game
Raoul “Gator” Fontenot & Iris “Flame” Johnson- Night Game
Kaden “Bishop” Montague & Tansy Meadows - Murder Game
Jeff Hollister - ?
Ian McGillicuddy - ?
Tucker Addison - ?
Nicolas “Nico” Trevane & Dahlia Le Blanc - Mind Game
Sam “Knight” Johnson & Azami “Thorn” Yoshiie – Samurai Game
Kyle “Ratchet” Forbes - ?
Jonas “Smoke” Harper & Camellia Mist - Phantom Game
Tom "Shark" Delaney - married to Angela Delaney (part of murder game)

Team One Deceased Members:
Dwayne Gibson, Morrison, Ron Shaver, Russell Cowling

Team Two (9)
Jess "Jesse" Calhoun & Saber Wynter  - Predatory Game
Logan Maxwell - ?
Neil Campbell - ?
Martin Howard - ?
Todd Aikens - ?
Trace Aikens- ?
Jack Norton & Briony "Bri" Jenkins – Conspiracy Game
Ken Norton & Marigold "Mari" Smith - Deadly Game
Antonio Martinez - ?

Team Three (11)
Kane Cannon & Rose Patterson – Ruthless Game
Mack McKinley & Jaimie Feildings -Street Game
Javier Enderman - Rihanna Bonds -Ruthless (implied) 
Gideon Carpenter - Laurel "Rory" Chappel -Ghostly Game 
Paul Mangan - ?
Brian Hutton - ?
Jacob Princeton - ?
Ethan Myers - ?
Marc Lands - ?
Lucas Atherton - ?
Rhianna Bonds - Javier Enderman (implied, see above)

Team Four (10)
Wyatt Fontenot & Pepper-Viper Game
Joe Spagnola - ? (Possibly Paired with Violet Smyth)
Malichai Fortunes & Amaryllis Johnson-Lethal Game 
Ezekiel Fortunes & Bellisia- Power Game
Mordechai Fortunes - ?
Trap Dawkins & Cayenne- Spider Game
Draden Freeman & Shylah Cosmos- Toxic Game
Gino Mazza & Zara Hightower - Covert Game
Diego Campo - ?
Ruben Campo & Jonquille- Lightning Game

External links

References 

Fantasy books by series
Novels by Christine Feehan